The 1989 South African Open was a tennis tournament played on indoor hard courts in Johannesburg in South Africa that was part of the 1989 Nabisco Grand Prix. It was the 86th edition of the tournament and was held from 13 through 19 November 1989.

Finals

Singles

 Christo van Rensburg defeated  Paul Chamberlin 6–4, 7–6, 6–3
 It was van Rensburg's 3rd title of the year and the 14th of his career.

Doubles

 Luke Jensen /  Richey Reneberg defeated  Kelly Jones /  Joey Rive 6–0, 6–4
 It was Jensen's only title of the year and the 2nd of his career. It was Reneberg's only title of the year and the 1st of his career.

References

External links
 ATP tournament profile
 ITF tournament edition details